Golf, for the 2013 Bolivarian Games, took place from 16 November to 19 November 2013.

Results

Men

First round
Saturday November 16, 2013

Second round
Sunday November 17, 2013

Third round
Monday November 18, 2013

Final round
Tuesday November 19, 2013

Men's Final Results
  Alvaro Pinedo Suarez
  Patricio Salem Sambuceti
  Sebastian Salem Sambuceti

Women

First round
Saturday November 16, 2013

Second round
Sunday November 17, 2013

References

Events at the 2013 Bolivarian Games
Bolivarian Games
Golf in Peru
2013 Bolivarian Games